In Christian theology, good works, or simply works, are a person's (exterior) actions or deeds, in contrast to inner qualities such as grace or faith.

Views by denomination

Anglican Churches 

The Anglican theological tradition, including The Church of England, The Episcopal Church (United States), and others in the worldwide Anglican Communion as well as those who have broken away from communion but identify with the tradition, contains within it both Protestant and Catholic perspectives on this doctrine.

On the Protestant side, the historic Thirty-nine Articles (1571) quoted in the Book of Common Prayer contain Article XI which states that "We are accounted righteous before God, only for the merit of our Lord and Savior Jesus Christ by faith and not for our work or deservings" (BCP, p. 870). Some Anglican Churches, such as the Church of England, still require clergy to affirm their loyalty to the Articles, while many others such as the Episcopal Church in the US do not see them as normative for clergy. In explaining this Anglican article of faith, John Wordsworth, former Bishop of Salisbury, says that "But by faith we understand not a dead but a living faith, which as naturally leads the believer to do good works for God as a good tree necessarily bears good fruit."

On the Catholic side, the 19th century Oxford Movement re-incorporated a broader understanding of justification into Anglican theology. The publication Tracts for the Times concluded in 1841 with commentary on Article XI in which justification by faith is affirmed as the "'sole internal instrument, not to sole instrument of any kind.' There is nothing inconsistent, then, in Faith being the sole instrument of justification, and yet Baptism also the sole instrument, and that at the same time, because in distinct senses; an inward instrument in no way interfering with an outward instrument, Baptism may be the hand of the giver, and Faith the hand of the receiver.' Nor does the sole instrumentality of Faith interfere with the doctrine of Works as a mean also." In this way, without denying the justification by faith alone in a particular sense, Anglicans may also affirm the necessity of the sacraments (particularly Baptism) as well as works present in a Christian's life:

In 2017 the Anglican Communion affirmed the 1999 Joint Declaration on the Doctrine of Justification between the Catholic and Lutheran traditions.

Baptist Churches 
According to evangelical Baptist theology, good works are the consequence of salvation and not its justification. They are the sign of a sincere and grateful faith. They include actions for the Great Commission, that is, evangelism, service in the Church and charity. They will be rewarded with the grace of God at the last judgment. Good works are claimed by some theologians as evidence of true faith versus false faith from the Epistle of James. A more recent article suggests that the current confusion regarding the Epistle of James about faith and works resulted from Augustine of Hippo's anti-Donatist polemic in the early fifth century. This approach reconciles the views of Paul and James on faith and works without appealing to Augustinian Calvinism's "evidence of true faith" view.

Catholic Church 
The Catholic Church teaches that both faith and good works are necessary for salvation:

 Additionally Matthew 16:27 states that the Son of God shall reward every man according to his works.

Eastern Orthodox Churches 
The Eastern Orthodox Churches teach the unity of faith and good works as necessary for salvation:

Lutheran Churches and Reformed Churches 
The Lutheran and Reformed principle of sola fide states that no matter what a person's action, salvation comes through faith alone.

Methodist Churches 
With regard to good works, A Catechism on the Christian Religion: The Doctrines of Christianity with Special Emphasis on Wesleyan Concepts teaches:

The Methodist Churches affirm the doctrine of justification by faith, but in Wesleyan–Arminian theology, justification refers to "pardon, the forgiveness of sins", rather than "being made actually just and righteous", which Methodists believe is accomplished through sanctification. John Wesley, the founder of the Methodist Churches, taught that the keeping of the moral law contained in the Ten Commandments, as well as engaging in the works of piety and the works of mercy, were "indispensable for our sanctification".

Methodist soteriology emphasize the importance of the pursuit of holiness in salvation. Thus, for Methodists, "true faith...cannot subsist without works". Bishop Scott J. Jones in United Methodist Doctrine writes that in Methodist theology:

Bishop Jones concludes that "United Methodist doctrine thus understands true, saving faith to be the kind that, give time and opportunity, will result in good works. Any supposed faith that does not in fact lead to such behaviors is not genuine, saving faith." Methodist evangelist Phoebe Palmer stated that "justification would have ended with me had I refused to be holy." While "faith is essential for a meaningful relationship with God, our relationship with God also takes shape through our care for people, the community, and creation itself." Methodism, inclusive of the holiness movement, thus teaches that "justification [is made] conditional on obedience and progress in sanctification" emphasizing "a deep reliance upon Christ not only in coming to faith, but in remaining in the faith." As such, in addition to entire sanctification, the Kentucky Mountain Holiness Association (a Methodist denomination in the holiness movement), affirms a belief in "the progressive growth in grace toward Christian maturity through a consistent Christian life of faith and good works."

Richard P. Bucher, contrasts this position with the Lutheran one, discussing an analogy put forth by the founder of the Methodist Church, John Wesley:

Oriental Orthodox Churches 
The Coptic Orthodox Church teaches:

The Coptic Orthodox Church says that a living faith should demonstrate good works, which are "the fruits of the work  of the Holy Spirit within us and are the fruits requisite for the life of penitence which we should live." Additionally, good works are "evidence of God's sonship". For Coptic Orthodox  Christians, neither faith alone nor works alone can save, but both together, are required for salvation.

See also

 Altruism (ethics)
 Biblical law in Christianity
 Divine grace
 Fate of the unlearned
 Karma
 Lordship salvation
 Mitzvah

References

Christian soteriology
Christian terminology